Sonja Zimmermann (born 15 June 1999) is a field hockey player from Germany, who plays as a defender.

Career

Club hockey
In the German Bundesliga, Zimmermann plays club hockey for Mannheimer HC.

National teams

Under–18
In 2015 and 2016, Zimmermann was a member of the German U–18 team at the EuroHockey Youth Championship in Santander and Cork respectively. At both tournaments, Germany finished in second place, earning Zimmermann silver medals on both occasions.

Under–21
Zimmermann has only represented the German U–21 team on one occasion at the 2017 EuroHockey Junior Championship in Valenica, where the team finished in fourth place.

Die Danas
In 2019, Zimmermann made her debut for the German national team during the inaugural tournament of the FIH Pro League. The team eventually won a bronze medal at the Grand Final in Amsterdam, Netherlands. Zimmermann represented the team again in August at the EuroHockey Nations Championship in Antwerp, Belgium. At the tournament, Germany finished in second place, winning Zimmermann a silver medal.

In December 2019, Zimmermann was named in the preliminary German Olympic squad to train for the 2020 Summer Olympics in Tokyo, Japan.

References

External links
 
 
 
 
 

1999 births
Living people
Female field hockey defenders
German female field hockey players
Mannheimer HC players
Feldhockey Bundesliga (Women's field hockey) players
Field hockey players at the 2020 Summer Olympics
Olympic field hockey players of Germany
21st-century German women